is a Japanese track and field athlete, specializing in the 800 metres. He was Japanese record holder in the 800 metres from October 18, 2009 until May 11, 2014.

He graduated the Keio University. He trains at Fujitsu Track & Field team. As the winner of the 2012 Japanese Olympic Trials, Masato represented his home country in the 2012 Summer Olympics.  He has also competed in the 2007 and 2011 IAAF World Championships in Athletics. As of 2012, he has won six Japan Championships (2006 - 2007, 2009 - 2012).

Masato trains in the United States as a member of the Santa Monica Track Club.

After his competition career, Masato currently is the head coach of the NIKE TOKYO TRACK CLUB in Tokyo, Japan.

Competition record

References

External links
 
 JAAF profile for Masato Yokota
 FUJITSU profile for Masato Yokota

1987 births
Living people
Japanese male middle-distance runners
Olympic athletes of Japan
Athletes (track and field) at the 2012 Summer Olympics
Asian Games competitors for Japan
Athletes (track and field) at the 2010 Asian Games
Japan Championships in Athletics winners
20th-century Japanese people
21st-century Japanese people